Uncial 0118 (in the Gregory-Aland numbering), ε 62 (Soden); is a Greek uncial manuscript of the New Testament, dated paleographically to the 8th century.

Description 
The codex contains a small fragment of the Gospel of Matthew 11:27-28, on one parchment leaves (11 cm by 10 cm). It is written in 10 lines per page, in uncial letters. The letters are large and leaned into right; it has breathings and accents.

The text-type of the Greek text of this codex is unknown. Text is too brief to classify. Aland did not placed it in any Category.

ΟΥΔΕ]ΤΟΝ[ΠΡ]Α
ΤΙΣΕΠΙΓΙΝΩΣ
ΚΕΙ.ΕΙΜΗΟΥΣ
ΚΑΙΩΕΑΝΒΟΥ
ΛΗΤΑΙΟΥΣΑ
ΠΟΚΑΛΥ[Ψ]ΑΙ.
ΔΕΥΤΕΠΡΟΣΜΕ
ΠΑΝΤΕΣΟΙΚΟ
ΠΙΩΝΤΕΣΚΑΙ
ΠΕΦΟΡΤΙΣΜΕ

History 
Currently it is dated by the INTF to the 8th century.

The codex was found in the end of the 19th century by J. Rendel Harris in the Saint Catherine's Monastery, in Sinai peninsula, where is located to the present day (Sinai Harris 6).

See also 
 List of New Testament uncials
 Textual criticism

References

Further reading 
 J. Rendel Harris, Biblical Fragments from Mount Sinai (London, 1890), pp. X, 15.

Greek New Testament uncials
8th-century biblical manuscripts